Hernán Moises Viera Espinoza (born January 16, 1993) is a Peruvian male weightlifter, competing in the 105 kg category and representing Peru at international competitions. He participated in the men's 105 kg event at the 2011 World Weightlifting Championships, and at the 2016 Summer Olympics, finishing in thirteenth position.

He won the gold medal in the men's 109kg event at the 2022 Pan American Weightlifting Championships held in Bogotá, Colombia. He won the silver medal in his event at the 2022 South American Games held in Asunción, Paraguay.

Major results

References

External links 
 

1993 births
Living people
Weightlifters at the 2016 Summer Olympics
Olympic weightlifters of Peru
Place of birth missing (living people)
Weightlifters at the 2011 Pan American Games
Pan American Games competitors for Peru
Weightlifters at the 2019 Pan American Games
Pan American Weightlifting Championships medalists
South American Games silver medalists for Peru
South American Games medalists in weightlifting
Competitors at the 2022 South American Games
21st-century Peruvian people